Perivoli is a mountain village and a former community in Grevena regional unit, West Macedonia, Greece. Since the 2011 local government reform it is part of the municipality Grevena, of which it is a municipal unit. Its population was 21 inhabitants as of 2011. The municipal unit has an area of 137.210 km2. It was the sixth-least densely populated municipality or community in all of Greece (behind Gramos, Sidironero, Paranesti, Antikythira, and Gavdos). The village is inhabited during winter by only 10-20 people due to extreme snow. However, the population rises to 4,000 people during the summer. There are many restored houses, inns, restaurants and cafes in the village. The inhabitants are mainly native Aromanians.

Geography
It is situated at an altitude of 1250–1370 meters in the southwest corner of Grevena regional unit in southwestern Greek Macedonia. The municipal unit has a land area of 137 km² and consists solely of one village, Perivóli. The southernmost portion of the municipal unit is part of the Pindos National Park.

References

External links
Pindos National Park
Official website 

Populated places in Grevena (regional unit)
Former municipalities in Western Macedonia
Aromanian settlements in Greece